Otto Crusius (20 December 1857 – 29 December 1918) was a German classical scholar. He was born in Hanover and died in Munich.

In his youth he was a student of Heinrich Ludolf Ahrens at the Lyceum in Hanover, afterwards studying classical philology at the University of Leipzig (1875–79). At Leipzig his influences included Otto Ribbeck and Rudolf Hildebrand. He earned his habilitation in 1883 and three years later was a professor at the University of Tübingen, succeeding Erwin Rohde. Later on, he worked as a professor at the University of Heidelberg (from 1898) and at Munich (from 1903). In 1915 he became president of the Bavarian Academy of Sciences as well as general curator of the Bavarian State collections.

His works include: "Beiträge zur griechischen Mythologie und Religionsgeschichte" (1886), "Untersuchungen zu den Mimiamben des Herondas" (1892), etc. He published editions of the poet Herondas, the fables of Babrius, "Anthologia lyrica Graeca" (1897 ff) and was an editor of the journal Philologus. After 1909 he published, with others, several volumes of "Das Erbe der Alten. Schriften Über Wesen und Wirkung Der Antike".

References

Sources

External links
 

1857 births
1918 deaths
Writers from Hanover
People from the Kingdom of Hanover
German classical scholars

Academic staff of Heidelberg University
Academic staff of the Ludwig Maximilian University of Munich
Academic staff of the University of Tübingen
German male writers